Florian Martin (born 19 March 1990) is a French professional footballer who plays as an attacking midfielder for Valenciennes.

Club career
He started his career with Lorient, but did not break into the first team and joined Carquefou in 2011, where he spent two seasons before signing for Chamois Niortais in the summer of 2013.

On 31 January 2022, Martin signed with Valenciennes until the end of the season, with an option to extend.

References

External links
 
 
 Florian Martin profile at foot-national.com
 

1990 births
Living people
Sportspeople from Lorient
French footballers
Association football midfielders
FC Lorient players
USJA Carquefou players
Chamois Niortais F.C. players
FC Sochaux-Montbéliard players
Paris FC players
Valenciennes FC players
Ligue 2 players
Championnat National players
Championnat National 2 players
Championnat National 3 players
Footballers from Brittany